The Gansu Provincial Library, also known as the Gansu Library, is a Lanzhou-based comprehensive and research-oriented public library, located at No. 488, Nanbinhe East Road, Chengguan District, Lanzhou City.

In 2008, Gansu Provincial Library was included in the first batch of the list of National Key Protection Unit for Ancient Books in China.

History
Gansu Provincial Library was established in 1916, initially named the Gansu Public Library, and was later renamed several times, receiving its current name in 1953.

In 1966, the Complete Works of the Four Treasuries collected by the Wenyuange was moved from Shenyang to Lanzhou and kept in the special bookshelf of Gansu Provincial Library. In 2005, the Book Collection Hall of Wenyuange Siku Quanshu was inaugurated, and the Complete Works of the Four Treasuries was moved to the new hall.

References

Libraries in China
Buildings and structures in Gansu
Libraries established in 1916